Hamanishiki Tatsurō (born November 23, 1976 as Tatsurō Takahama) is a former sumo wrestler from Kumamoto, Japan. A former amateur champion, he made his professional debut in 1999. His highest rank was maegashira 11, which he reached in 2002. He was mostly ranked in the makushita and sandanme divisions from 2005 until his retirement in 2012. He became an elder of the Japan Sumo Association upon his retirement and was the head coach of Kasugayama stable from 2012 until 2016.

Career
Takahama practised amateur sumo at Nihon University and joined the professional sport in March 1999. He made his debut alongside Kotomitsuki and Takamisakari. He began wrestling under his own name but upon promotion to the second highest jūryō division in July 2000 he adopted the shikona or fighting name of Hamanishiki.

After five tournaments in jūryō he made his debut in the top makuuchi division in May 2001. However he was unable to progress higher than the lower maegashira ranks and fell back to the second division in September 2002. In November 2004, ranked at the very bottom of jūryō, he produced a disastrous 1-14 record and was demoted to the third makushita division, where he had begun his career. He reverted to his own surname in November 2005 but this did little to change his fortunes. He missed two tournaments through injury in November 2006 and January 2007 and was demoted once more, to the fourth sandanme division.

He managed to return to the makushita division after a good 6-1 performance in January 2008, and he followed up with a 5-2 score in March and 4-3 in May, which took him to makushita 26 for the July 2008 tournament, his highest rank since September 2006, before his injury. He returned to the Hamanishiki name in July 2009.

In May 2011 he earned promotion back to the jūryō division for the first time in over six years after scoring 6-1 at makushita 10. There were a large number of positions available in jūryō due to the forced retirements of several wrestlers after a match-fixing scandal. The 39 tournaments it took him to return to jūryō is the most in sumo history. His stay in jūryō lasted only two tournaments however, as he could score only 5-10 in July and 2-13 in September.

Retirement from sumo

He retired in February 2012 and took charge of the Kasugayama stable as the previous head, former maegashira Kasugafuji, concentrated on his role as a director of the Sumo Association's board. After a legal dispute with the former Kasugafuji, who subsequently left the Sumo Association and claimed rent had not been paid to him, Hamanishiki moved the stable to a new location in Kawasaki city. Continuing legal disputes with the former head of the stable meant that he had not been given the official certificate granting him ownership of the Kasugayama elder stock, and thus was not qualified to be a stablemaster. In October 2016 the Sumo Association ordered him to resign as stablemaster, and move his wrestlers to Oitekaze stable. Kasugayama did so, but he left the Sumo Association altogether in January 2017, having failed to meet their deadline to come to an agreement with his predecessor. His lawsuit was settled at the Tokyo High Court the following month.

Fighting style
Hamanishiki was a yotsu-sumo wrestler, who preferred grappling techniques to pushing or thrusting. His most common winning kimarite was a straightforward yori-kiri or force out. His favourite grip on his opponent's mawashi was migi-yotsu, a left hand outside, right hand inside position.

Career record

See also
Glossary of sumo terms
List of past sumo wrestlers

References

External links

1976 births
Living people
Japanese sumo wrestlers
People from Kumamoto
Sumo people from Kumamoto Prefecture
Nihon University alumni